VA-22 has the following meanings:
Attack Squadron 22 (U.S. Navy)

State Route 22 (Virginia)